Randy Smith (born June 14, 1974) is an American video game designer. He co-owns and is the creative director of Tiger Style. He has worked extensively on the Thief series with both Looking Glass Studios and Ion Storm.

Smith started Tiger Style in 2009 and shipped the award-winning game Spider: The Secret of Bryce Manor on iOS, followed by Waking Mars and Spider: Rite of the Shrouded Moon. He spent time on the Steven Spielberg collaboration code-named LMNO at EA Los Angeles studio, which was eventually canceled. Smith has lectured on game design at GDC, and additionally, Smith has participated in the Indie Game Jam.

Between 2007 and 2013, Smith wrote a monthly column called "The Possibility Space" for Edge in the UK.

Games credited
Thief: The Dark Project (1998)
Thief II: The Metal Age (2000)
Thief: Deadly Shadows (2004)
Dark Messiah of Might and Magic (2006)
LMNO (Cancelled)
Spider: The Secret of Bryce Manor (2009)
Waking Mars (2012)
Spider: Rite of the Shrouded Moon (2015)
Project C (TBA) 
Jett: The Far Shore (2021)

References

External links

Randy Smith's Rap Sheet on MobyGames
Randy Smith's column "The Possibility Space" in Edge magazine

1974 births
American video game designers
Living people